"99 Bottles of Beer" or "100 Bottles of Pop on the Wall" is a song dating to the mid-20th century. It is a traditional reverse counting song in both the United States and Canada. It is popular to sing on road trips, as it has a very repetitive format which is easy to memorize and can take a long time when families sing. In particular, the song is often sung by children on long school bus trips, such as class field trips, or on Scout or Girl Guide outings.

Lyrics 

The song's lyrics are as follows, with mathematical values substituted:

(n) bottles of beer on the wall. (n) bottles of beer. Take one down, pass it around, (n-1) bottles of beer on the wall. (caution: this mathematical formula ends with n=1, the song does not use negative numbers).

Alternative line:
If one of those bottles should happen to fall,
98 bottles of beer on the wall...
The same verse is repeated, each time with one bottle fewer, until there is none left. Variations on the last verse following the last bottle going down include lines such as:
No more bottles of beer on the wall, no more bottles of beer.

Go to the store and buy some more, 99 bottles of beer on the wall...
Or:
No more bottles of beer on the wall, no more bottles of beer.

We've taken them down and passed them around; now we're drunk and passed out!

Other alternate lines read:

If that one bottle should happen to fall, what a waste of alcohol!
Or:
No more bottles of beer on the wall, no more bottles of beer.

There's nothing else to fall, because there's no more bottles of beer on the wall.

Or:
 The song does not stop at the last "1" or "0" bottles of beer but continues counting with −1 (Negative one) Bottles of beer on the wall Take one down, pass it around, −2 (negative 2) bottles of beer on the wall... continuing onward through the negative numbers

Andy Kaufman routine
The boring and time-consuming nature of the "99 Bottles of Beer" song means that probably only a minority of renditions are done to the final verse. The American comedian Andy Kaufman exploited this fact in the routine early in his career when he would actually sing all 100 verses.

Atticus 
Atticus, a band from Knoxville, Tennessee recorded a thirteen and a half minute live version of the song in its entirety at a club in Glasgow, Scotland called The Cathouse. It was included in the 2001 album Figment. Rich Stewart aka Barroom Rambler listed it the number one drinking song out of 86 in an article for Modern Drunkard Magazine the following year.

Mathematically inspired variants
Donald Byrd has collected dozens of variants inspired by mathematical concepts and written by himself and others.
(A subset of his collection has been published.)
Byrd argues that the collection has pedagogic as well as amusement value. Among his variants are:
"Infinity bottles of beer on the wall". If one bottle is taken down, there are still infinite bottles of beer on the wall (thus creating an unending sequence much like "The Song That Never Ends").
"Aleph-null bottles of beer on the wall". Aleph-null is the size of the set of all natural numbers, and is the smallest infinity and the only countable one; therefore, even if an infinite aleph-null of bottles fall, the same amount remains.
"Aleph-one/two/three/etc. bottles of beer on the wall". Aleph-one, two, three, etc. are uncountable infinite sets, which are larger than countable ones; therefore, if only a countable infinity of bottles fall, an uncountable number remains.

Other versions in Byrd's collection involve concepts including geometric progressions, differentials, Euler's identity,
complex numbers, summation notation, the Cantor set, the Fibonacci sequence, and the continuum hypothesis, among others.

References in computer science

Numerous computer programs exist to output the lyrics to the song. This is analogous to "Hello, World!" programs, with the addition of a loop. As with "Hello World!", this can be a practice exercise for those studying computer programming, and a demonstration of different programming paradigms dealing with looping constructs and syntactic differences between programming languages within a paradigm.

The program has been written in over 1,500 different programming languages.

Example

Rust 
fn main() {
    let mut i = 99;
    loop {
        if i == 1 {
            println!("{} bottle of beer on the wall, {} bottle of beer.\nTake one down and pass it around, there's no more bottles of beer on the wall!", i, i);
            break;
        } else {
            println!("{} bottles of beer on the wall, {} bottles of beer.\nTake one down and pass it around, now there's {} more bottles of beer on the wall!", i, i, (i - 1));
        }
        i -= 1;
    }
}

See also 
 "Potje met vet" – a traditional Dutch song sung in the same style
 "Ten Green Bottles" – a similar song which is popular in the United Kingdom

References

American folk songs
American children's songs
Traditional children's songs
Drinking songs